John III of Armagnac (1359 – July 25, 1391) was a Count of Armagnac, of Fézensac and Rodez from 1384 to 1391.

He was the son of John II of Armagnac, and Joan of Périgord.

In 1390, John  claimed the Kingdom of Majorca, but was overcome by the troops of John I of Aragon in a battle near Navata. John consequently led military actions in Roussillon.

In 1391, he had to leave for Italy in order to go to the assistance of Charles Visconti, Lord of Parma and husband of his sister, Beatrice of Armagnac. Visconti was in conflict with his acquisitive cousin Gian Galeazzo Visconti, later the duke of Milan, whose ambition was to control the whole of northern Italy.

His army was attacked and decisively beaten by that of Gian Galeazzo Visconti as it passed through Alessandria in Piedmont. John was killed in the battle.

Family
On May 14, 1378, John married  Margaret (1363–1443), countess of Comminges (1363–1443). They had two daughters:

Joan, who married Guillaume-Amanieu de Madaillan (1375–1414) in 1409.
Margaret, who married William II of Narbonne in 1415.  He was killed in the battle of Verneuil, on August 14, 1424).

References

Sources

1359 births
1391 deaths
John III